James D. Mockler (March 9, 1939 – November 24, 2014) was an American politician. He served as a Republican member of the Wyoming House of Representatives.

Life and career 
Mockler was born in Lander, Wyoming, the son of Esther and Frank Mockler. He attended Dubois High School, Schattuck Military School, Laramie High School and the University of Wyoming. He became a real estate agent, opening up his own business Mockler Land and Realty.

In 1973, Mockler was elected to the Wyoming House of Representatives, representing Big Horn County, Wyoming. In 1974 he urged Harry Leimback to resign from his senatorial seat when he was running for governor as Leimback viewed it as a "virtual cinch" and was blocking the election of a new senator for Natrona County. He served until 1976 and moved to Helena and was executive director of the Montana Coal Council.

Mockler died in November 2014, at the age of 75, in Helena, Montana and the James D. Mockler memorial Fund was established to help young people to learn a trade.

References 

1939 births
2014 deaths
People from Lander, Wyoming
Republican Party members of the Wyoming House of Representatives
20th-century American politicians
University of Wyoming alumni
American real estate brokers
Laramie High School (Wyoming) alumni